Penicillium limosum is a species of the genus of Penicillium which was isolated from marine sediment.

References

limosum
Fungi described in 1995